The headquarters of the French Communist Party are located at 2 Place du Colonel Fabien in the 19th arrondissement of Paris. The lead architect was Oscar Niemeyer, who had designed many buildings in Brazil's new capital Brasília.

Description
It was designed in 1966 and works began in 1968. The building was inaugurated in 1971; its external dome was not fully completed until 1980. It was built in concrete and has curves. The dome, where the party's National Council sits, represents a pregnant woman according to the architect. Niemeyer, himself a communist, designed the building while living in exile in France during the military dictatorship in Brazil. In designing the building, Niemeyer collaborated with Paul Chemetov, José L. Pinho, Jean Prouvé, and Jacques Tricot.

A survey by 20 minutes in 2020 found the building to be one that divided opinions the most among Parisians, alongside the Tour Montparnasse and the Sacré-Cœur.

Other uses
When Robert Hue was party leader, it was agreed for fashion shows and filming to take part at the headquarters for extra income. The first was by Prada in 2000, followed by Thom Browne and Jean Paul Gaultier. Belgian singer Angèle filmed the video for "Jalousie" here, as did Alain Souchon for "Et si en plus, y a personne". The film Mood Indigo (2013) and the series Osmosis were also recorded here. As of 2012, the building only had 44 permanent staff, and was considered disproportionately large by Libération; national secretary Pierre Laurent said that the party would never sell the building.

In August 2008, the decision was made to rent out the top two of the six floors to private companies under the name Espace Niemeyer, which would save €3 million of an annual budget of €12 million. The first tenants were Autochenille Production, a comics and animation company.

Gallery

References

Footnotes

Bibliography

Further reading

External links

 

French Communist Party
French Communist
Buildings and structures in the 19th arrondissement of Paris
Oscar Niemeyer buildings
Modernist architecture in France
Monuments historiques of Paris